Vincent J. Zellinger was a member of the Wisconsin State Assembly.

Biography
Zellinger was born on February 10, 1901, in what later became the Republic of Czechoslovakia. He took military training at Camp Custer, Michigan in 1926. He later moved to Phillips, Wisconsin. He died on May 5, 1966.

Career
Zellinger was first elected to the Assembly in 1946. Additionally, he was Clerk of Phillips and was town clerk. Zellinger also served on the school board. He was a Republican.

References

Czechoslovak emigrants to the United States
People from Phillips, Wisconsin
Mayors of places in Wisconsin
School board members in Wisconsin
Republican Party members of the Wisconsin State Assembly
1901 births
1966 deaths
20th-century American politicians